Gleb Fetisov ((born June 5, 1966, in Elektrostal, Moscow Region, USSR) is a Russian billionaire., investor, film producer with Oscar-nominated movie productions, Member of the National Academy of Motion Pictures Arts and Sciences of Russia, formerly involved in the Russian banking industry, Member of the Russian Academy of Sciences, PhD and professor of economics and finance, former member of the Federation Council for the Voronezh Region (2001—2009) and former chair of Green Alliance party (2012—2015).

Film production 
(2018, Cinema Production, Fetisoff Illusion) starring Konstantin Khabensky and Christopher Lambert. “Loveless” was nominated and “Sobibor” was selected for Oscar in the Best Foreign Language Film category in 2018.

Persecution 
In December 2015, he resigned from his position at the Green Alliance Party and withdrew from politics. In 2015, the U.S. Department of State included Gleb Fetisov in the list of persons under “politically motivated unfounded criminal prosecution” in their home country.

My Bank 
On 28 February 2014, Fetisov was arrested by the Russian Investigative Committee on suspicion of fraud as part of criminal investigation into the bankruptcy of My Bank. In May 2017, the London Court of International Arbitration declared Gleb Fetisov not responsible for the bankruptcy of My Bank.

References

1966 births
Living people
21st-century Russian businesspeople
People from Elektrostal
20th-century Russian businesspeople
Russian film producers
Russian billionaires
Russian economists
Full Members of the Russian Academy of Sciences
Green Alliance (Russia) politicians
Russian bankers
21st-century Russian politicians
Members of the Russian Academy of Sciences
Members of the Federation Council of Russia (after 2000)